Psychilis, common name peacock orchid, is a genus of flowering plants from the orchid family, Orchidaceae. It consists of about 15 species native to the West Indies.

Species 
Species accepted as of June 2022:

Natural Hybrids

See also 
 List of Orchidaceae genera

References

External links 

Laeliinae genera
Laeliinae